Cape Hinode is a rock cape  west of Akebono Glacier on the coast of Queen Maud Land, Antarctica. The cape and many of its nearby features were mapped and named from surveys and air photos by the Japanese Antarctic Research Expedition, 1957–62. The name Hinode-misaki means "sunrise cape".

Nearby features 

A pair of large rocks called the Meoto Rocks lie off the coast just west of Cape Hinode. off the coast of Queen Maud Land, Antarctica. "Meotoiwa" means "husband and wife rocks". Niban Rock protrudes into the sea  to the southwest,

References

Headlands of Queen Maud Land
Prince Olav Coast